Aphaenogaster fulva is a species of ant in the family Formicidae.

Subspecies
These two subspecies belong to the species Aphaenogaster fulva:
 Aphaenogaster fulva azteca Enzmann, 1947 i c g
 Aphaenogaster fulva fulva Roger, 1863 i c g
Data sources: i = ITIS, c = Catalogue of Life, g = GBIF, b = Bugguide.net

References

Further reading

External links

 

fulva
Articles created by Qbugbot
Insects described in 1863
Taxa named by Julius Roger